Han Nolan (born August 25, 1956) is an American writer of young adult fiction. She has published nine young adult novels. 
She won the U.S. National Book Award for Young People's Literature in 1997 for the novel Dancing on the Edge.

Bibliography
 If I Should Die Before I Wake (1994)
 Send Me Down a Miracle (1996)
 Dancing on the Edge (1997)
 A Face in Every Window (1999)
 Born Blue (2000)
 When We Were Saints (2003)
 A Summer of Kings (2006)
 Crazy (2010)
 Pregnant Pause (2011)

References

External links
 
 Han Nolan at Answers.com 
 

1956 births
American children's writers
American writers of young adult literature
National Book Award for Young People's Literature winners
Living people